Nico Matern (born 27 November 1992) is a German professional footballer who plays as a midfielder for Atlas Delmenhorst. He played futsal for Hamburg Panthers.

Career
In his youth, Matern played for FC St. Pauli and Hallescher FC. From the youth teams of Hallescher FC, he moved to Wuppertaler SV in the semi-professional Regionalliga West. He played his first and only game for Wuppertaler SV on 28 October 2011 under coach Hans-Günter Bruns in a 1–0 victory against the Bayer Leverkusen reserves.

Afte one season, he left Wuppertaler SV again and moved to SV Drochtersen/Assel in the Oberliga Niedersachsen. He debuted for Drochtersen/Assel on 3 August 2012 in a 3–0 victory against Lüneburger SK Hansa. His first goal for the team came in the 66th minute of a 17 November 2012 match against Lüneburger SK Hansa; it was the second out of four in what would be a shut-out victory for his club.

After two seasons, he moved to FC Hansa Rostock, where he spent much of his time playing for the reserve squad (Hansa Rostock II). His first game in the Oberliga Nordost for Hansa Rostock II took place on 3 August 2014, a 4–0 defeat against SV Altlüdersdorf. Under coach Peter Vollmann, he made his professional debut with the first team on 6 September 2014, when he was subbed in at the 80th minute of a 1–0 defeat against Hallescher FC.

For the 2015–16 season, he moved to FC Schoenberg 95 where he debuted on 26 July 2015. In his first appearance, he scored what would be the lone goal of the match for either side in the 18th minute.

After a season, he left the FC Schoenberg 95 and moved to his hometown to play for Buxtehuder SV. He made his debut in the Oberliga Hamburg on 31 July 2016 in a 4–1 defeat against .

In 2017, Matern left German club Buxtehuder SV to attend Indiana Wesleyan University in the United States and play for the Indiana Wesleyan Wildcats.

In 2018, he signed a two-year contract with the second-division club Indy Eleven in the United Soccer League. Matern was a regular contributor for Indy, starting in all 27 of his appearances that season.

Matern was one of just seven players on Indy's 2018 roster that returned for the 2019 season after a frenzy of new signings in the offseason. However, as of 30 March, he had not seen much playing time in 2019.

References

External links
 
 
 
 IWU Profile

1992 births
Living people
People from Stade (district)
Association football midfielders
German footballers
Indiana Wesleyan University alumni
FC St. Pauli players
Hallescher FC players
Wuppertaler SV players
SV Drochtersen/Assel players
FC Hansa Rostock players
FC Schönberg 95 players
Buxtehuder SV players
Indy Eleven players
VfB Oldenburg players
FC Teutonia Ottensen players
Atlas Delmenhorst players
3. Liga players
Regionalliga players
USL Championship players
Footballers from Lower Saxony
German expatriate footballers
German expatriate sportspeople in the United States
Expatriate soccer players in the United States